Since the early 2000s, DreamWorks Animation, an American animation studio, owned by NBCUniversal, has had an involvement in the creation and theming of amusement park rides and attractions. This article details the ventures of DreamWorks Animation in amusement parks.

History
In 2003, Universal Parks & Resorts opened the 4D film called Shrek 4-D at Universal Studios Florida, Universal Studios Hollywood and Universal Studios Japan. The film is chronologically sequenced between the original 2001 film Shrek and Shrek 2 which was released in 2004. In 2005 and 2008, Shrek 4-D was added to Warner Bros. Movie World and Movie Park Germany respectively (the film was later removed from Warner Bros. Movie World and Movie Park Germany in favour of Journey to the Center of the Earth 4-D Adventure and Ice Age: The 4D Experience).

On 18 March 2010, DreamWorks Animation moved further into the theme park industry with the opening of two themed lands at Universal Studios Singapore. The first land is Madagascar which is based upon the 2005 film of the same name. The second land is Far Far Away which is based on the Shrek franchise. Each of the lands featured a variety of attractions themed after the movies. In 2011, Dreamworld announced a $10 million deal with DreamWorks Animation to bring the company's characters to their amusement park. In a 3-stage development beginning on 19 December 2011, Dreamworld will open new shows and newly themed rides and attractions.

In May 2012, the Brazilian theme park Beto Carrero World announced a partnership with DreamWorks Animation, later that year Shrek and other characters began to make meet and greets around the park. The first area with DreamWorks Animation characters opened in February 2014, themed to Madagascar, the area features two attractions, a live show and a river rapids ride. In March 2016, Beto Carrero World and DreamWorks Animation renewed the partnership for more 10 years, and announced three new themed areas featuring Shrek, How to Train Your Dragon, and Kung Fu Panda. The construction is scheduled to start in 2017.

In July 2012, DreamWorks CEO Jeffrey Katzenberg announced that the attractions at the American Dream Mall (formerly Meadowland Mills and Meadowland Xanadu) in the Meadowlands Sports Complex at East Rutherford, New Jersey will be themed to DreamWorks' animated productions. In September 2016, the mall's owner Triple Five Group announced that Nickelodeon Universe will also occupy the indoor amusement park space and Dreamworks Animation would work with partnership in creating the park. In November 2018, the mall's vice president of Communications announced the opening date of September 2019 but by that date it was delayed to November 27, 2019, before being delayed again. By October 25, 2019, the Nickelodeon Universe theme park opened at the American Dream. In February 2020, the park announced its opening date of March 19, 2020. However, the onset COVID-19 pandemic caused American Dream to delay the opening again. In September 2020, the park announced that it will finally open on October 1, 2020, along with the rest of the mall. On October 1, 2020, DreamWorks Water Park officially opened to the public.

In February 2013, it was revealed that DreamWorks Animation has partnered with Regions GC to build in Russia Europe's largest indoor theme parks. Set in Moscow, Saint Petersburg and Yekaterinburg, each park will incorporate a movie and concert hall, 4D movie theater, three-star 400-room hotel and retails. The parks, which are expected to be completed in 2015, will feature themes based on Shrek, Madagascar, How to Train Your Dragon, Kung Fu Panda, and Turbo.

In May 2013, DreamWorks signed a licensing agreement with Sands China to bring its cast of animated characters to Sands Cotai Central in Macau. The resorts will present a series of performances, parades, dining experiences, meet-and-greets and photo opportunities highlighting characters such as Po from Kung Fu Panda; Shrek, Fiona and Puss in Boots from Shrek; Alex the Lion, King Julien and the Penguins from Madagascar and Toothless and Hiccup from How to Train Your Dragon.

Locations

Attractions
Below is a list of all of the attractions at DreamWorks Animation themed areas around the world. The dates shown in the columns refer to the opening and closing dates for the ride under that name. It does not mean that the ride was closed and/or removed.

Gallery

References

 
Amusement rides by theme